South Kolan  is a rural locality in the Bundaberg Region, Queensland, Australia.

Geography
The Burnett River flows through the locality.

The neighbourhood of Birthamba is located in the north-eastern area of South Kolan; it takes its name from the former Birthamba railway station on the now closed Mount Perry railway line. Birthamba is an Aboriginal word meaning camp.

The former neighbourhood of Kalbar is located in the eastern area of South Kolan. Kalbar Road  still bears the name. It is located in the bend of the Burnett River opposite South Bingera / Branyan. (This is not to be confused with the town of Kalbar (formerly Engelsburg) in the Scenic Rim Region).

The neighbourhood of Koolboo is located in the north-western area of South Kolan; it takes its name from the former Kooboo railway station on the now closed Mount Perry railway line. Koolboo is named after a local Aboriginal clan leader.

History 
The name Kolan is believed to be a Kabi language word kalang meaning good.

Kolan South State School opened on 29 July 1878.

In 1882, a Methodist Church was established in South Kolan in the area known as Hill End. In 1903, it was replaced by a new building which was subsequently enlarged.

Kalbar Plantation was owned by Dr May of Bundaberg; a sugar mill was erected there in 1883.

A Union church was opened in 1884 and has been used by a number of denominations.

Kalbar Provisional School opened on 26 February 1896. On 1 January 1909, it became Kalbar State School. It closed on 15 June 1962.

The Bingera Railway Station Provisional School opened in 1907, becoming a State School in 1909. It closed in 1963. It was in James Street (approx ). The name refers to the nearby (former) Bingera railway station on the now-closed Mount Perry railway line, which was at the intersection of Raines Road and Ten Mile Road.

St Mary's Anglican Church was dedicated on 11 March 1979 by Archbishop Felix Arnott. It closed during 1994.

Many properties damaged by the 2010-2011 Queensland floods and 2013 floods, which saw extensive repairs and adjustments made to the approaches of the Cedars Road Bridge Crossing.

Economy
Industry in the district consists of cattle farming, sugar cane production and milling, and commercial fruit and vegetable production. The township, although small, has a convenience store, Kolan South State Primary School, a police station and The South Kolan Pub which also has accommodation facilities. South Kolan is also frequented by many residents of surrounding rural areas such as Pine Creek and Gin Gin.

Education
Kolan South State School is a government primary (Prep-6) school for boys and girls at 2297 Gin Gin Road. In 2017, the school had an enrolment of 124 students with 7 teachers (6 full-time equivalent) and 7 non-teaching staff (4 full-time equivalent).

Culture
Entertainment in South Kolan is centered on local school events and social events at the South Kolan Pub, which hosts live music on a weekly basis with acts performed by local artists. Each afternoon patrons are treated to a live comedic show by local resident Ross Griffiths. Karen Griffiths is also an esteemed singer who specializes in harmonizing and frequently performs at the venue.

Sport
The South Kolan football club affectionately known as the "sharkies" hosts home games in football season while still remaining a family atmosphere as well as being open most weekends for socialising and a good time while having a cold beverage.

Events 
Each year the South Kolan Pub hosts its 'Australia Day Warm Beer and Cold Pie Contest'. The prestigious winning title was awarded to local legend Thomas Griffiths in 2014.

Attractions 
South Kolan is home to the Mystery Craters. Discovered in 1971, the origin of the 35 oddly shaped craters has been the subject of controversy.

Climate 
South Kolan has a subtropical climate with wet, hot summers and mild winters.

See also

 Bundaberg
 List of tramways in Queensland

References

External links

Bundaberg Region
Tourist attractions in Bundaberg
Localities in Queensland